Sirachat Preedaboon (born September 1, 1983) is a professional footballer from Thailand.
His Thai nickname is "Chan."

External links
http://www.airforceunited.com/players/p08.html
https://web.archive.org/web/20120430012529/http://www.thaipremierleague.co.th/news_detail.php?nid=00216

1983 births
Living people
Sirachat Preedaboon
Sirachat Preedaboon
Association football goalkeepers
Sirachat Preedaboon
Sirachat Preedaboon
Sirachat Preedaboon
Sirachat Preedaboon
Sirachat Preedaboon